Family Prayers is a 1993 American drama film starring Joe Mantegna, Anne Archer, Paul Reiser and Patti LuPone. It was directed by Scott Rosenfeld. It is notable for being the first film role of Brittany Murphy, who had a non-speaking role.

Plot 

Set in 1969 Los Angeles, this movie aims at nostalgia but really is more a depiction of the tragedy of a dysfunctional family. Young Andrew, a 13-year-old male on the brink of manhood, is saddled with a father who is a compulsive gambler and a mother who is immersed in a constant battle with him because of it. Often desperate for money, their dependence on Andrew’s aunt Nan for money is one more cause of tension and anxiety in an already unhappy household. As Andrew cares for himself and his younger sister, the symbol of his coming of age—his approaching bar-mitzvah—comes to symbolize more than just a rite of passage.

Cast 
 Joe Mantegna as Martin Jacobs
 Anne Archer as Rita Jacobs
 Tzvi Ratner-Stauber as Andrew Jacobs
 Julianne Michelle as Fay Jacobs
 Paul Reiser as Dan Linder
 Patti LuPone as Aunt Nan
 Conchata Ferrell as Mrs. Romeyo
 David Marguiles as Uncle Sam
 Shiri Appleby as Nina
 Allen Garfield as Cantor
 Keaton Simons as Mark
 Milt Oberman as Al
 Gina Hecht as Arlene
 James Terry as Mike
 John Capodice as Barber #1
 Brittany Murphy as Elise

References

External links 
 Family Prayers at the Internet Movie Database

1993 films
1993 drama films
American drama films
1990s English-language films
1990s American films